Bṛhatkathā (Sanskrit, "the Great Narrative") is an ancient Indian epic, said to have been written by Guṇāḍhya in a poorly-understood language known as Paiśācī. The work no longer exists but several later adaptations — the Kathāsaritsāgara (कथासरित्सागर), Bṛhatkathāmañjarī (बृहत्कथामंजरी) and Bṛhatkathāślokasaṃgraha (बृहत्कथाश्लोकसंग्रह) in Sanskrit, as well as the Peruṅkatai and Vasudevahiṃḍi in vernaculars —  make commentary on the piece.

The date of its composition is uncertain. According to testimonials by later Sanskrit poets such as Daṇḍin, Subandhu, and Bāṇa, the Bṛhatkathā existed in the 6th century CE. According to other estimates it predates that period by several more centuries. For example, if the story of Udayana by poet Bhāsa (and also later by Harsha in Ratnavali) was inspired by Brihatkatha, it had to be older than the time of Bhāsa — itself uncertain, but before the 3rd century CE.

Early references
The earliest extant reference to the Bṛhatkathā seems to be that of Subandhu (600-700 CE) in Vasavadatta. Bāṇa (7th century) refers to it in his romances Harshacharita and Kadambari. A reference by Daṇḍin in his Kavyadarsha is problematic because it describes the Bṛhatkathā as being marvelous and as composed in the vernacular of the bhūtas (evidently Paiśācī). However, the information appears to be second-hand. A fuller reference is provided in Dashakumaracharita, whose author is possibly not the same Daṇḍin. Later references include the Daśarūpa of Dhanamjaya, Nalacampū of Trivikramabhaṭṭa, and Āryāsaptaśatī of Govardhanācārya. A Cambodian inscription (c. 875) expressly mentions Guṇāḍhya and his aversion to Prakrit. The earliest extant Kannada work on grammar and poetics, Kavirajamarga by Nripatunga (c. 850), mentions a now-lost Sanskrit version of Bṛhatkathā by the author Durvinita. We can safely assume the existence of a romantic work by Guṇāḍhya before 600 CE.

Reconstructed content

Although several derivative works remain today, they differ so greatly that they cannot be used to reconstruct the Bṛhatkathā in its totality. However, some strong inferences can be made about its content based on their similarities.

Udayana

Due to a dohada ("pregnancy craving"), Mṛgāvatī, pregnant with Udayana, is either covered or immersed in red. A monstrous bird mistakes her for raw meat and carries her away, later dropping her. She is cared for in a hermitage, where she raises her son. Udayana obtains a wonderful lute, elephant-taming skills, and confidants; he and his mother eventually return to their home, Kauśāmbī.

Udayana is later captured by Pradyota, the King of Ujjayinī. Here, he teaches the lute to Pradyota's daughter, Vāsavadattā, and they fall in love. Eventually, they escape to Kauśāmbī, where Udayana's rightful kingship is restored, and they are married. But, fearing Udayana is weakening, and desiring an additional political alliance, Udayana's ministers make him believe that Vāsavadattā is dead, and arrange a marriage to Padmāvatī.

Though he is later reunited with Vāsavadattā, Udayana remains childless. Later, as a boon of Kubera, Vāsavadattā becomes pregnant with Naravāhanadatta (his name means "given by Kubera"), who is fated to become the emperor of the Vidyādharas.

Naravānhanadatta

Udayana's life serves as the prelude to the central story of his son, Naravānhanadatta. Unlike his father, who appears in several works unrelated to the Bṛhatkathā, Naravānhanadatta is known only from texts demonstrably linked to the Bṛhatkathā.

Legendary origin

For the origin of Brihatkatha as described in Kathasaritsagara, see the adjacent diagram.

Notes

References
 (reprint, from the Quarterly Journal of the Mythic Society, of Tabard's translation of Lacôte 1908)
  (PhD Dissertation)

 Vol I, Vol II, Vol III, Vol IV, Vol V, Vol VI, Vol VII, Vol VIII, Vol IX, or as proofread HTML eBook Volume 1-9, including thousands of notes and large appendixes.
 
 

Indian poetics
History of literature in India
Prakrit literature
Paisachi literature
Epic poems
B